Little is a synonym for small size and may refer to:

Arts and entertainment
Little (album), 1990 debut album of Vic Chesnutt
Little (film), 2019 American comedy film
The Littles, a series of children's novels by American author John Peterson
The Littles (TV series), an American animated series based on the novels

Places
Little, Kentucky, United States
Little, West Virginia, United States

Other uses
Clan Little, a Scottish clan
Little (surname), an English surname
Little (automobile), an American automobile manufactured from 1912 to 1915
Little, Brown and Company, an American publishing company
USS Little, multiple United States Navy ships

See also

Little Mountain (disambiguation)
Little River (disambiguation)
Little Island (disambiguation)